Luis Donaldo Hernández González (born 2 February 1998) is a Mexican professional footballer who plays as a defender.

Honours
Tapachula
Ascenso MX: Clausura 2018

References

External links
 

1998 births
Living people
Mexican footballers
Association football defenders
Chiapas F.C. footballers
Cafetaleros de Chiapas footballers
Club Necaxa footballers
Deportivo Toluca F.C. players
Liga MX players
Ascenso MX players
Liga Premier de México players
Tercera División de México players
Footballers from Jalisco
People from Tepatitlán